La Sagouine is a play written by New Brunswick author Antonine Maillet that tells the story of la Sagouine, an Acadian cleaning lady from rural New Brunswick.  The play is a collection of monologues, written in Acadian French. It has since been translated into English by Luis de Céspedes in 1984, and most recently by Wayne Grady in 2007, based on the second enlarged edition published in 1974 by Les Éditions Lemeac.

References

1971 plays
Acadian culture in New Brunswick
Fictional characters from New Brunswick
French-language plays
Canadian plays